Wilfred Lancaster (27 September 1904 – July 1987) was an English professional association footballer who played as an outside forward. Born in Backbarrow, Lancashire, he was playing for the Dick, Kerr's company team when he was signed by Football League First Division side Burnley in December 1924.

Lancaster made his League debut on 26 December 1924 in the 0–2 defeat away at Huddersfield Town, and played again the following match against Everton. He then spent two months out of the team, returning for the 5–4 win over West Ham United on 28 February 1925. Lancaster made his final appearance for Burnley in the penultimate fixture of the 1924–25 campaign, a 1–1 draw with Aston Villa at Turf Moor.<ref> He was released by Burnley in April 1925, and his whereabouts thereafter are unknown.

References

1904 births
1987 deaths
English footballers
Association football forwards
Dick, Kerr's F.C. players
Burnley F.C. players
English Football League players